Lisa is a commune located in Brașov County, Transylvania, Romania, in the Făgăraș area. It is well known in the area for its winter holidays customs (Ceata de Feciori).

The commune is composed of three villages: Breaza (Breáza), Lisa and Pojorta (Posorta).

The well-known Romanian writer Octavian Paler was born in Lisa, in 1926, where he graduated the primary school.

Lisa has a museum called La Vâltori, which hosts a 100-year-old installation for creating traditional wool blankets. The installation is powered with water from Lisa River.

Nearby Lisa a visitor can also find the Sâmbăta de Sus Monastery, and in Breaza, 4 km to the south, the remains of a medieval fortress.

During the 1950s, the village was severely oppressed by the communist regime, as a group of fighters against communism were active in the region. Many lost their lives or were imprisoned by the communist authorities. See the story of Ion Gavrilă Ogoranu, and the long list of fighters from Lisa.

References

External links
 Articol in Jurnalul National, Iulie 2009, despre Lisa
La Vâltori museum

Communes in Brașov County
Localities in Transylvania